NanoCharm is a cooperation of eight European organisations and is an
EU-Project founded in the 7th framework program. The goal of this
European collaboration is to establish and enhance ellipsometry and
polarimetry as a measurement tool.

The partners

Projects and goals
Ellipsometry and polarimetry are methods to characterize samples
according to their optical properties and composition. The measurements
do not influence or destroy the samples and are calculated in real-time
experiments. Therefore, these methods are suitable for characterizing
samples in-situ and to further monitor the growth process.

The NanoCharm project aims to strengthen the collaboration of users
(scientific and industrial) and their needs with the manufacturers of
ellipsometers.

For this reason, the NanoCharm consortium is organising annual summer
and winter schools during the three years of the project (from
1 January 2008 until 31 December 2010). Additionally, a website has been
established to act as a platform for all users. The website
provides news, a collection of literature, databases, a virtual lab and a
forum for discussion.

External links
 https://web.archive.org/web/20080312031043/http://www.nanocharm.org/
 Nanocharm at CORDIS database

European Union
Optics institutions